Lastomerci is a dispersed village in the valley of the upper course of the Ščavnica River and the surrounding hills in the Municipality of Gornja Radgona  in northeastern Slovenia.

References

External links
Lastomerci on Geopedia

Populated places in the Municipality of Gornja Radgona